Draco guentheri, commonly known as Günther's flying lizard is a species of agamid "flying dragon" endemic to the Philippines.

Geographic range
D. guentheri is found on the islands of Basilan, Bongao, Jolo, Mindanao, Sanga-Sanga, Siasi, and Simunul.

Etymology
The specific name, guentheri, is in honor of German-British zoologist Albert Gunther.

Taxonomy
This species was originally described in 1885 by the Belgian-British zoologist George Albert Boulenger, who named it Draco guentheri.

This species is also notable for having been collected by the Philippine national hero Jose Rizal during his exile in Dapitan, Mindanao in 1893 and identified it as a new type of lizard in which he tentatively named, Draco dapitani. Rizal sent specimens to Europe, to the German zoologist Benno Wandolleck. In 1900 Wandolleck, thinking Rizal's specimens represented a new species, described it and named it Draco rizali, thereby creating a synonym. Rizal's specimens, subsequently, were destroyed during the bombing of Dresden in World War II.

In 1936 Hennig considered this lizard to be part of what he called a subspecies, Draco volans reticulatus. In 1993 Gaulke raised it to full species status. And most recently, in 2000, McGuire and Alcala once again recognized Boulenger's original Draco guentheri as a valid species.

References

Further reading
Boulenger GA (1885). Catalogue of the Lizards in the British Museum (Natural History). Second Edition. Volume I. Geckonidæ, Eublepharidæ, Uroplatidæ, Pygopodidæ, Agamidæ. London: Trustees of the British Museum (Natural History). (Taylor and Francis, printers). xii + 436 pp. + Plates I- XXXII. (Draco guentheri, new species, pp. 257–258 + Plate XX, Figure 2).
McGuire JA, Alcala AC (2000). "A Taxonomic Revision of the Flying Lizards (Iguania: Agamidae: Draco) of the Philippine Islands, with a Description of a New Species". Herpetological Monographs 14: 81–138. (Draco guentheri, p. 100).

rizali
Reptiles of the Philippines
Endemic fauna of the Philippines
Fauna of Basilan
Fauna of Sulu
Fauna of Tawi-Tawi
Fauna of Mindanao
Reptiles described in 1885
Taxa named by George Albert Boulenger